Corentin Corre (Trémel) was a Breton cyclist.  He participated in the first Paris–Brest–Paris race in 1891 (he arrived fourth out of 207 participants).

References

French male cyclists
Year of birth missing
Year of death missing
Sportspeople from Côtes-d'Armor
Cyclists from Brittany